Elections to Chesterfield Borough Council in Derbyshire, England were held on 7 May 2015, at the same time as the 2015 UK General Election. All of the council falls up for election every four years and the Labour group increased their majority on the council.

Election result
After the election, the composition of the council was:
Labour 38
Liberal Democrat 9
UKIP 1

Ward by ward

Ward results

References

2015 English local elections
May 2015 events in the United Kingdom
2015
2010s in Derbyshire